The 1953–54 Idaho Vandals men's basketball team represented the University of Idaho during the 1953–54 NCAA college basketball season. Members of the Pacific Coast Conference, the Vandals were led by seventh-year head coach Charles Finley and played their home games on campus at Memorial Gymnasium in Moscow, Idaho.

After seven years at Idaho, Finley left after the season for Mississippi Southern, and was succeeded in May by Harlan Hodges, the head coach at Murray State in Kentucky.

References

External links
Sports Reference – Idaho Vandals: 1953–54 basketball season
Gem of the Mountains: 1954 University of Idaho yearbook – 1953–54 basketball season
Idaho Argonaut – student newspaper – 1954 editions

Idaho Vandals men's basketball seasons
Idaho 
Idaho
Idaho